Willis Clopton Pulliam (January 14, 1878 – August 2, 1952) was an American politician who served in the Virginia House of Delegates.

References

External links 

1878 births
1952 deaths
Members of the Virginia House of Delegates
20th-century American politicians